A hotline is a point-to-point communications link in which a call is automatically directed to the preselected destination.

Hotline or Hot Line may also refer to:

Telephonic services
 Helpline, any telephone service which offers help to those who call
 Crisis hotline, a telephone service which offers help to those who call
 Phone sex services, the business of erotic talks by phone
 Moscow–Washington hotline, a system that allows direct communication between the leaders of the United States and Russia

Music

Albums
 Hotline (The J. Geils Band album), 1975
 Hotline (Nazia and Zohaib Hassan album), 1987
 Hotline (White Heart album)
 Hot Line (album), a 1964 album by Bill Barron

Songs
 "Hot Line" (song), a 1976 disco song performed by the American musical group The Sylvers
 "Hotline", a 2004 song recorded by Ciara for her debut album, Goodies
 "Hotline", a 2022 song from Hummingbird (Black Party album)

Film
 Hot Line (film), a 1968 comedy spy thriller
 Hotline (1982 film), a 1982 made-for-TV thriller film
 Hotline (2014 film), a 2014 film
 The Hotline (film), a 1974 Australian TV film

Other uses
 The Hotline, a daily political briefing published in Washington, D.C.
 Hot Line (TV series), an American erotic anthology series featured on Cinemax
 Hotline Communications, a software company, and their Hotline Connect program suite

See also

 
 
 Helpline (disambiguation)
 Line (disambiguation)
 Hot (disambiguation)